In enzymology, a bilirubin-glucuronoside glucuronosyltransferase is an enzyme that catalyzes the chemical reaction

2 bilirubin-glucuronoside  bilirubin + bilirubin-bisglucuronoside

Hence, this enzyme has one substrate, bilirubin-glucuronoside, and two products, bilirubin and bilirubin-bisglucuronoside.

This enzyme belongs to the family of glycosyltransferases, specifically the hexosyltransferases.  The systematic name of this enzyme class is bilirubin-glucuronoside:bilirubin-glucuronoside D-glucuronosyltransferase. Other names in common use include bilirubin monoglucuronide transglucuronidase, and bilirubin glucuronoside glucuronosyltransferase.

References

 

EC 2.4.1
Enzymes of unknown structure